Clan MacGowan (also MacGowin, MacCowan, McGowan) was a Scoto-Irish clan which once occupied the area around the River Nith in Dumfries and Galloway, documented in the 1300s.

History
Clanmacgowin of Stranith was a Scoto-Irish clan recorded in the middle of the 14th century when Donald Edzear acquired the captainship from David II of Scotland. Galloway makes no solid distinction between the names McOwen, McEwen, McKeoune, McCowan, McGowan, etc., all of which can be easily conflated and confused when spoken, and the spellings of which were often not fixed until later in history.  McCowan is an old family name from the Kirkconnel area where Robert the Bruce had a company of McCowans in the upper Nith district. The name here may indicate descent from Owen the Bald, king of the Strathclyde Britons, who was killed in 1018.

See also
McGowan
McCown
McCowan baronets

References

Scottish clans
Armigerous clans
Scottish diaspora in Europe
Ulster Scots people